Joyee is a  Bengali television soap opera that premiered on 9 October 2017. It aired on Zee Bangla. It was produced by Tent Cinema and it starred Debadrita Basu and Dibyojyoti Dutta. It also presents Sanchari Mondal, Mimi Dutta, Tanuka Chatterjee, and Dwaipayan Das in supporting roles. The show replaced Raadha. Arun Bandyopadhyay is the main antagonist. The show went off air on 1 September 2019 and it was replaced by another show titled Alo Chhaya.

Plot
Joyee is the story of a fun-loving and innocent orphan girl. She lives with her maternal uncle and aunt and is a die-heart football lover. Her dream is to become a footballer. To break the barriers of social taboos, she often disguises as a boy to get to play. She has to give into her family's demands and  she marries.

Thereon starts a different life. She is totally unaware about what is in store. Her in-laws are extremely conservative and believe that a woman's only job is to run a household and look after her husband. Her husband, Ribhu is extremely studious, almost a nerd who is clueless about his wife's liking for sport. The family has an aversion towards sports. Another antagonist is Sukumar, who is in love with Irabati (Ribhu's sister-in-law) and always tries to harm Joyee. Joyee uses her football skills of evasion and maneuver to survive as a wife and a family member. She remains determined to be a successful footballer.

A sad subplot involves Agni (Ribhu's Sejdabhai). He has been kidnapped by Sagar Dutta, a football coach who used to take money from innocent footballers. Agni wanted to catch Sagar Dutta red handed. Joyee's other aim is to find her Sejdabhai and to punish Sagar Dutta.

After six months, Joyee is back as Jessica who is a look-alike of Joyee and Joyee is back to take revenge from Sukumar. However, she is able to take the revenge.

Cast

Main
Dibyojyoti Dutta as Ribhu: Joyee's husband
Debadrita Basu as Joyee / Jessica Fernandes / Malati / Patralekha: Ribhu's wife

Recurring
Ranit Modak as Sukumar 
Sanchari Mondal as Irabati: Ribhu's Sister-in-law/Agni's wife
Arun Banerjee as Bibi/Bisewar Banerjee
Misty Das as Riya/Liza: Joyee's Sister/Ankhi
Ankur Roy as Ranjan
Soham Chakraborty as Chinku: Joyee-Ribhu's Son- He dreams to be a footballer one day like his mother. 
Alokananda Guha as Soumi 
Alivia Sarkar as Malini Sen  
Tanmay Majumdar as Ayan
Mimi Dutta as Krishna: Ribhu's Sister-in-law
Dwaipayan Das as Ribhu's Cousin
Tanuka Chatterjee  as Ribhu's Aunt/Jamuna
Bidipta Chakraborty as Ribhu's Sister
Sananda Basak as Churni: Ribhu's Sister-in-law.
Sarbari Mukherjee as Aloka:Joyee's maternal Aunt
Partha Sarathi Deb as Partha Sarathi Dasgupta: Ribhu's Father
Joy Bhattacharya as Sagar Dutta
Ayush Das as Bablu
Mayna Banerjee as Mayurakshi: Ribhu's Elder Sister
Anirban Ghosh as Arjun Dasgupta :Ribhu's Elder Brother
Rajiv Bose as Agni Dasgupta/Sejdavai
Dwaipayan Chakraborty as Ayan Bhattacharya:Torsha's Friend
Aishi Bhattacharya as Torsha
Surojit Banerjee as Ribhu's uncle
Saptajayi Maji as Tomtom / Krishna's Son
Sahana Sen as Anannya / Megha: Sukumar's Sister
Sayantani Guhathakurta as Sudha / Joyee's Mother (flashback) 
Sourav Chakraborty as Swornedu: Joyee's Father
Mritwika Oss as I.P.S. Sumana Roy
Rishabh Das as teenage Tomtom 
Debika Mitra as Kaveri Dasgupta
Biswarup Bandyopadhyay as Rony
Ranjini Chatterjee as Sukumar's mother
Elfina Mukherjee as Arjun's second wife
Sayantani Sengupta as Mohua
Saugata Bandyopadhyay as Somudro

References

External links
Official Website at ZEE5

2017 Indian television series debuts
2019 Indian television series endings
Zee Bangla original programming